The 1912 VFL season was the 16th season of the Victorian Football League (VFL), the highest level senior Australian rules football competition in Victoria. The season featured ten clubs, ran from 27 April until 28 September, and comprised an 18-game home-and-away season followed by a finals series featuring the top four clubs.

The premiership was won by the Essendon Football Club for the fourth time and second time consecutively, after it defeated  by 14 points in the 1912 VFL Grand Final.

Premiership season
In 1912, the VFL competition consisted of ten teams of 18 on-the-field players each, with no "reserves", although any of the 18 players who had left the playing field for any reason could later resume their place on the field at any time during the match.

Each team played each other twice in a home-and-away season of 18 rounds.

Once the 18 round home-and-away season had finished, the 1912 VFL Premiers were determined by the specific format and conventions of the amended "Argus system".

Round 1

|- bgcolor="#CCCCFF"
| Home team
| Home team score
| Away team
| Away team score
| Venue
| Date
|- bgcolor="#FFFFFF"
| 
| 17.14 (116)
| 
| 6.6 (42)
| EMCG
| 27 April 1912
|- bgcolor="#FFFFFF"
| 
| 9.16 (70)
| 
| 4.7 (31)
| Princes Park
| 27 April 1912
|- bgcolor="#FFFFFF"
| 
| 6.10 (46)
| 
| 7.11 (53)
| Junction Oval
| 27 April 1912
|- bgcolor="#FFFFFF"
| 
| 7.5 (47)
| 
| 4.10 (34)
| Lake Oval
| 27 April 1912
|- bgcolor="#FFFFFF"
| 
| 9.14 (68)
| 
| 5.9 (39)
| MCG
| 27 April 1912

Round 2

|- bgcolor="#CCCCFF"
| Home team
| Home team score
| Away team
| Away team score
| Venue
| Date
|- bgcolor="#FFFFFF"
| 
| 5.8 (38)
| 
| 2.23 (35)
| Punt Road Oval
| 4 May 1912
|- bgcolor="#FFFFFF"
| 
| 13.15 (93)
| 
| 6.11 (47)
| Corio Oval
| 4 May 1912
|- bgcolor="#FFFFFF"
| 
| 6.17 (53)
| 
| 10.10 (70)
| Victoria Park
| 4 May 1912
|- bgcolor="#FFFFFF"
| 
| 8.12 (60)
| 
| 10.8 (68)
| MCG
| 4 May 1912
|- bgcolor="#FFFFFF"
| 
| 5.11 (41)
| 
| 9.10 (64)
| Brunswick Street Oval
| 4 May 1912

Round 3

|- bgcolor="#CCCCFF"
| Home team
| Home team score
| Away team
| Away team score
| Venue
| Date
|- bgcolor="#FFFFFF"
| 
| 7.14 (56)
| 
| 5.6 (36)
| Brunswick Street Oval
| 11 May 1912
|- bgcolor="#FFFFFF"
| 
| 9.9 (63)
| 
| 6.12 (48)
| MCG
| 11 May 1912
|- bgcolor="#FFFFFF"
| 
| 6.18 (54)
| 
| 3.4 (22)
| Lake Oval
| 11 May 1912
|- bgcolor="#FFFFFF"
| 
| 12.21 (93)
| 
| 4.12 (36)
| Junction Oval
| 11 May 1912
|- bgcolor="#FFFFFF"
| 
| 8.11 (59)
| 
| 6.14 (50)
| EMCG
| 11 May 1912

Round 4

|- bgcolor="#CCCCFF"
| Home team
| Home team score
| Away team
| Away team score
| Venue
| Date
|- bgcolor="#FFFFFF"
| 
| 11.12 (78)
| 
| 5.5 (35)
| Corio Oval
| 18 May 1912
|- bgcolor="#FFFFFF"
| 
| 6.9 (45)
| 
| 6.10 (46)
| Princes Park
| 18 May 1912
|- bgcolor="#FFFFFF"
| 
| 3.13 (31)
| 
| 7.14 (56)
| MCG
| 18 May 1912
|- bgcolor="#FFFFFF"
| 
| 9.6 (60)
| 
| 13.8 (86)
| Punt Road Oval
| 18 May 1912
|- bgcolor="#FFFFFF"
| 
| 8.8 (56)
| 
| 9.8 (62)
| Lake Oval
| 18 May 1912

Round 5

|- bgcolor="#CCCCFF"
| Home team
| Home team score
| Away team
| Away team score
| Venue
| Date
|- bgcolor="#FFFFFF"
| 
| 5.5 (35)
| 
| 7.8 (50)
| Junction Oval
| 25 May 1912
|- bgcolor="#FFFFFF"
| 
| 8.11 (59)
| 
| 4.8 (32)
| Brunswick Street Oval
| 25 May 1912
|- bgcolor="#FFFFFF"
| 
| 7.7 (49)
| 
| 7.10 (52)
| EMCG
| 25 May 1912
|- bgcolor="#FFFFFF"
| 
| 10.12 (72)
| 
| 6.4 (40)
| Victoria Park
| 25 May 1912
|- bgcolor="#FFFFFF"
| 
| 8.2 (50)
| 
| 5.14 (44)
| MCG
| 25 May 1912

Round 6
Prior to this round, it was noted by the Football Record that Melbourne had been generally strong while competing at their home ground, but had faltered while away.

|- bgcolor="#CCCCFF"
| Home team
| Home team score
| Away team
| Away team score
| Venue
| Date
|- bgcolor="#FFFFFF"
| 
| 11.12 (78)
| 
| 10.6 (66)
| Brunswick Street Oval
| 1 June 1912
|- bgcolor="#FFFFFF"
| 
| 12.15 (87)
| 
| 6.11 (47)
| Princes Park
| 1 June 1912
|- bgcolor="#FFFFFF"
| 
| 5.8 (38)
| 
| 9.16 (70)
| MCG
| 1 June 1912
|- bgcolor="#FFFFFF"
| 
| 10.10 (70)
| 
| 13.14 (92)
| Punt Road Oval
| 1 June 1912
|- bgcolor="#FFFFFF"
| 
| 13.13 (91)
| 
| 2.15 (27)
| Corio Oval
| 1 June 1912

Round 7

|- bgcolor="#CCCCFF"
| Home team
| Home team score
| Away team
| Away team score
| Venue
| Date
|- bgcolor="#FFFFFF"
| 
| 10.13 (73)
| 
| 4.12 (36)
| Victoria Park
| 3 June 1912
|- bgcolor="#FFFFFF"
| 
| 13.15 (93)
| 
| 8.13 (61)
| Lake Oval
| 3 June 1912
|- bgcolor="#FFFFFF"
| 
| 6.10 (46)
| 
| 8.7 (55)
| Junction Oval
| 3 June 1912
|- bgcolor="#FFFFFF"
| 
| 8.6 (54)
| 
| 16.12 (108)
| MCG
| 3 June 1912
|- bgcolor="#FFFFFF"
| 
| 7.8 (50)
| 
| 17.17 (119)
| Punt Road Oval
| 3 June 1912

Round 8

|- bgcolor="#CCCCFF"
| Home team
| Home team score
| Away team
| Away team score
| Venue
| Date
|- bgcolor="#FFFFFF"
| 
| 14.14 (98)
| 
| 4.9 (33)
| MCG
| 8 June 1912
|- bgcolor="#FFFFFF"
| 
| 8.15 (63)
| 
| 3.8 (26)
| Corio Oval
| 8 June 1912
|- bgcolor="#FFFFFF"
| 
| 6.19 (55)
| 
| 10.6 (66)
| EMCG
| 8 June 1912
|- bgcolor="#FFFFFF"
| 
| 13.10 (88)
| 
| 11.7 (73)
| Victoria Park
| 8 June 1912
|- bgcolor="#FFFFFF"
| 
| 8.16 (64)
| 
| 6.10 (46)
| Princes Park
| 8 June 1912

Round 9

|- bgcolor="#CCCCFF"
| Home team
| Home team score
| Away team
| Away team score
| Venue
| Date
|- bgcolor="#FFFFFF"
| 
| 2.12 (24)
| 
| 7.13 (55)
| Junction Oval
| 15 June 1912
|- bgcolor="#FFFFFF"
| 
| 4.16 (40)
| 
| 7.12 (54)
| Punt Road Oval
| 15 June 1912
|- bgcolor="#FFFFFF"
| 
| 3.7 (25)
| 
| 8.8 (56)
| Brunswick Street Oval
| 15 June 1912
|- bgcolor="#FFFFFF"
| 
| 4.16 (40)
| 
| 4.8 (32)
| Lake Oval
| 15 June 1912
|- bgcolor="#FFFFFF"
| 
| 8.10 (58)
| 
| 10.17 (77)
| MCG
| 15 June 1912

Round 10

|- bgcolor="#CCCCFF"
| Home team
| Home team score
| Away team
| Away team score
| Venue
| Date
|- bgcolor="#FFFFFF"
| 
| 6.6 (42)
| 
| 12.14 (86)
| Punt Road Oval
| 22 June 1912
|- bgcolor="#FFFFFF"
| 
| 3.10 (28)
| 
| 9.12 (66)
| Brunswick Street Oval
| 22 June 1912
|- bgcolor="#FFFFFF"
| 
| 6.17 (53)
| 
| 6.9 (45)
| Victoria Park
| 22 June 1912
|- bgcolor="#FFFFFF"
| 
| 7.10 (52)
| 
| 16.24 (120)
| MCG
| 22 June 1912
|- bgcolor="#FFFFFF"
| 
| 12.7 (79)
| 
| 8.12 (60)
| Corio Oval
| 22 June 1912

Round 11

|- bgcolor="#CCCCFF"
| Home team
| Home team score
| Away team
| Away team score
| Venue
| Date
|- bgcolor="#FFFFFF"
| 
| 13.14 (92)
| 
| 5.7 (37)
| MCG
| 29 June 1912
|- bgcolor="#FFFFFF"
| 
| 6.8 (44)
| 
| 4.15 (39)
| Princes Park
| 29 June 1912
|- bgcolor="#FFFFFF"
| 
| 19.12 (126)
| 
| 5.7 (37)
| Lake Oval
| 29 June 1912
|- bgcolor="#FFFFFF"
| 
| 12.11 (83)
| 
| 9.14 (68)
| Junction Oval
| 29 June 1912
|- bgcolor="#FFFFFF"
| 
| 6.18 (54)
| 
| 6.10 (46)
| EMCG
| 29 June 1912

Round 12

|- bgcolor="#CCCCFF"
| Home team
| Home team score
| Away team
| Away team score
| Venue
| Date
|- bgcolor="#FFFFFF"
| 
| 11.19 (85)
| 
| 4.4 (28)
| Punt Road Oval
| 13 July 1912
|- bgcolor="#FFFFFF"
| 
| 0.8 (8)
| 
| 13.8 (86)
| MCG
| 13 July 1912
|- bgcolor="#FFFFFF"
| 
| 8.15 (63)
| 
| 6.4 (40)
| Victoria Park
| 13 July 1912
|- bgcolor="#FFFFFF"
| 
| 10.16 (76)
| 
| 4.9 (33)
| Princes Park
| 13 July 1912
|- bgcolor="#FFFFFF"
| 
| 10.13 (73)
| 
| 5.10 (40)
| Corio Oval
| 13 July 1912

Round 13

|- bgcolor="#CCCCFF"
| Home team
| Home team score
| Away team
| Away team score
| Venue
| Date
|- bgcolor="#FFFFFF"
| 
| 15.12 (102)
| 
| 6.14 (50)
| Junction Oval
| 20 July 1912
|- bgcolor="#FFFFFF"
| 
| 10.10 (70)
| 
| 3.11 (29)
| Brunswick Street Oval
| 20 July 1912
|- bgcolor="#FFFFFF"
| 
| 7.10 (52)
| 
| 9.11 (65)
| EMCG
| 20 July 1912
|- bgcolor="#FFFFFF"
| 
| 7.12 (54)
| 
| 5.13 (43)
| MCG
| 20 July 1912
|- bgcolor="#FFFFFF"
| 
| 3.14 (32)
| 
| 8.7 (55)
| Victoria Park
| 20 July 1912

Round 14

|- bgcolor="#CCCCFF"
| Home team
| Home team score
| Away team
| Away team score
| Venue
| Date
|- bgcolor="#FFFFFF"
| 
| 4.18 (42)
| 
| 5.7 (37)
| Princes Park
| 27 July 1912
|- bgcolor="#FFFFFF"
| 
| 14.7 (91)
| 
| 7.18 (60)
| Lake Oval
| 27 July 1912
|- bgcolor="#FFFFFF"
| 
| 7.8 (50)
| 
| 12.14 (86)
| MCG
| 27 July 1912
|- bgcolor="#FFFFFF"
| 
| 13.14 (92)
| 
| 5.10 (40)
| Corio Oval
| 27 July 1912
|- bgcolor="#FFFFFF"
| 
| 6.4 (40)
| 
| 10.15 (75)
| Punt Road Oval
| 27 July 1912

Round 15

|- bgcolor="#CCCCFF"
| Home team
| Home team score
| Away team
| Away team score
| Venue
| Date
|- bgcolor="#FFFFFF"
| 
| 12.13 (85)
| 
| 7.5 (47)
| Lake Oval
| 3 August 1912
|- bgcolor="#FFFFFF"
| 
| 10.12 (72)
| 
| 5.13 (43)
| EMCG
| 3 August 1912
|- bgcolor="#FFFFFF"
| 
| 7.15 (57)
| 
| 6.8 (44)
| Victoria Park
| 3 August 1912
|- bgcolor="#FFFFFF"
| 
| 6.6 (42)
| 
| 6.7 (43)
| MCG
| 3 August 1912
|- bgcolor="#FFFFFF"
| 
| 6.15 (51)
| 
| 7.12 (54)
| Junction Oval
| 3 August 1912

Round 16

|- bgcolor="#CCCCFF"
| Home team
| Home team score
| Away team
| Away team score
| Venue
| Date
|- bgcolor="#FFFFFF"
| 
| 4.8 (32)
| 
| 6.15 (51)
| Corio Oval
| 17 August 1912
|- bgcolor="#FFFFFF"
| 
| 12.17 (89)
| 
| 8.7 (55)
| Brunswick Street Oval
| 17 August 1912
|- bgcolor="#FFFFFF"
| 
| 9.8 (62)
| 
| 7.8 (50)
| EMCG
| 17 August 1912
|- bgcolor="#FFFFFF"
| 
| 8.20 (68)
| 
| 8.11 (59)
| Princes Park
| 17 August 1912
|- bgcolor="#FFFFFF"
| 
| 6.7 (43)
| 
| 6.20 (56)
| MCG
| 17 August 1912

Round 17

|- bgcolor="#CCCCFF"
| Home team
| Home team score
| Away team
| Away team score
| Venue
| Date
|- bgcolor="#FFFFFF"
| 
| 9.9 (63)
| 
| 11.7 (73)
| Punt Road Oval
| 24 August 1912
|- bgcolor="#FFFFFF"
| 
| 7.8 (50)
| 
| 12.22 (94)
| MCG
| 24 August 1912
|- bgcolor="#FFFFFF"
| 
| 15.18 (108)
| 
| 7.8 (50)
| Junction Oval
| 24 August 1912
|- bgcolor="#FFFFFF"
| 
| 9.11 (65)
| 
| 4.3 (27)
| Brunswick Street Oval
| 24 August 1912
|- bgcolor="#FFFFFF"
| 
| 6.10 (46)
| 
| 7.10 (52)
| Lake Oval
| 24 August 1912

Round 18

|- bgcolor="#CCCCFF"
| Home team
| Home team score
| Away team
| Away team score
| Venue
| Date
|- bgcolor="#FFFFFF"
| 
| 9.14 (68)
| 
| 7.7 (49)
| MCG
| 31 August 1912
|- bgcolor="#FFFFFF"
| 
| 9.16 (70)
| 
| 4.9 (33)
| Corio Oval
| 31 August 1912
|- bgcolor="#FFFFFF"
| 
| 7.13 (55)
| 
| 6.13 (49)
| EMCG
| 31 August 1912
|- bgcolor="#FFFFFF"
| 
| 5.7 (37)
| 
| 7.11 (53)
| Victoria Park
| 31 August 1912
|- bgcolor="#FFFFFF"
| 
| 10.14 (74)
| 
| 10.9 (69)
| Princes Park
| 31 August 1912

Ladder

Finals

All of the 1912 finals were played at the MCG so the home team in the semi-finals and Preliminary Final is purely the higher ranked team from the ladder but in the Grand Final the home team was the team that won the Preliminary Final.

Semi-finals

|- bgcolor="#CCCCFF"
| Home team
| Score
| Away team
| Score
| Venue
| Date
|- bgcolor="#FFFFFF"
| Carlton
| 10.11 (71)
| Geelong
| 4.19 (43)
| MCG
| 7 September
|- bgcolor="#FFFFFF"
| Essendon
| 7.12 (54)| South Melbourne
| 6.6 (42)
| MCG
| 14 September

Preliminary final

|- bgcolor="#CCCCFF"
| Home team| Score| Away team| Score| Venue| Date|- bgcolor="#FFFFFF"
| Essendon| 7.10 (52)| Carlton
| 6.12 (48)
| MCG
| 21 September

Grand final

|- bgcolor="#CCCCFF"
| Home team| Score| Away team| Score| Venue| Date|- bgcolor="#FFFFFF"
| Essendon| 5.17 (47)| South Melbourne
| 4.9 (33)
| MCG
| 28 September

Essendon defeated South Melbourne 5.17 (47) to 4.9 (33), in front of a crowd of 54,436 people. (For an explanation of scoring see Australian rules football).

Awards
 The 1912 VFL Premiership team was Essendon.
 The VFL's leading goalkicker was Harry Brereton of Melbourne with 56 goals.
 University took the "wooden spoon" in 1912.

Notable events
 On 27 April 1912, the first issue of the VFL's Football Record' was published.
 For the first time, all VFL players wore a number on the back of their guernseys. The number designated the player himself, rather than his position and, in most cases, he played his entire career with the same number on his back (however, if he changed clubs, his number would also alter).
 University's Round 3 victory over Richmond was ultimately to be the last win in the VFL club's history. University would go on to lose its next 51 matches (including two winless seasons in 1913 and 1914), a VFL/AFL record, before they dropped out of the competition.
 South Australia defeated Victoria 9.8 (62) to 6.7 (43) in Adelaide on 10 August 1912.
 In a match against Collingwood, Essendon's Dan Hanley was impeded from taking part in a contest for the ball along one of the boundary lines, when a boundary umpire grasped him by the hand. There were no "official" witnesses to this incredible incident, and the boundary umpire went unpunished.
 The captains of the two 1912 second semi-final teams, Allan Belcher of Essendon and Vic Belcher of South Melbourne, were brothers. This is a VFL/AFL record.
 VFL decided to appoint two stewards to each match. They had the power to report players. They wear an all-white uniform, with the word "Steward" in red on their breast.

References

Sources
 Maplestone, M., Flying Higher: History of the Essendon Football Club 1872–1996, Essendon Football Club, (Melbourne), 1996. 
 Rogers, S. & Brown, A., Every Game Ever Played: VFL/AFL Results 1897–1997 (Sixth Edition)'', Viking Books, (Ringwood), 1998.

External links
 1912 Season – AFL Tables

Australian Football League seasons
VFL season